The 1967 New York Yankees season was the 65th season for the Yankees. The team finished ahead of only the Kansas City Athletics (who moved to Oakland after the season ended) in the American League final standings, with a record of 72–90, finishing 20 games behind the Boston Red Sox. New York was managed by Ralph Houk. The Yankees played at Yankee Stadium.

Offseason 
 November 28, 1966: Frank Tepedino was drafted by the Yankees from the Baltimore Orioles in the 1966 first-year draft.
 November 29, 1966: Clete Boyer was traded by the Yankees to the Atlanta Braves for Bill Robinson and Chi-Chi Olivo.
 December 8, 1966: Roger Maris was traded by the Yankees to the St. Louis Cardinals for Charley Smith.
 December 10, 1966: Pedro Ramos was traded by the Yankees to the Philadelphia Phillies for Joe Verbanic and cash.

Regular season 
 May 14, 1967: At Yankee Stadium, Mickey Mantle hit his 500th home run in the bottom of the seventh inning in a 6–5 Yankee win over the Baltimore Orioles.

Season standings

Record vs. opponents

Notable transactions 
 June 6, 1967: Steve Rogers was drafted by the Yankees in the 60th round of the 1967 Major League Baseball Draft, but did not sign.
 July 4, 1967: Ray Barker, players to be named later, and cash were traded by the Yankees to the Baltimore Orioles for Steve Barber. The Yankees completed the deal by sending Chet Trail (minors) and Joe Brady (minors) to the Orioles on December 15, 1967.
 August 3, 1967: Elston Howard was traded by the Yankees to the Boston Red Sox for Pete Magrini and a player to be named later. The Red Sox completed the deal by sending Ron Klimkowski to the Yankees on August 8.

Roster

Player stats

Batting

Starters by position 
Note: Pos = Position; G = Games played; AB = At bats; H = Hits; Avg. = Batting average; HR = Home runs; RBI = Runs batted in

Other batters 
Note: G = Games played; AB = At bats; H = Hits; Avg. = Batting average; HR = Home runs; RBI = Runs batted in

Pitching

Starting pitchers 
Note: G = Games pitched; IP = Innings pitched; W = Wins; L = Losses; ERA = Earned run average; SO = Strikeouts

Other pitchers 
Note: G = Games pitched; IP = Innings pitched; W = Wins; L = Losses; ERA = Earned run average; SO = Strikeouts

Relief pitchers 
Note: G = Games pitched; W = Wins; L = Losses; SV = Saves; ERA = Earned run average; SO = Strikeouts

Farm system 

LEAGUE CHAMPIONS: Binghamton

Notes

References 
1967 New York Yankees at Baseball Reference
1967 New York Yankees team page at www.baseball-almanac.com

New York Yankees seasons
New York Yankees
New York Yankees
1960s in the Bronx